Alfred Hitchcock Presents is an American television anthology series created, hosted and produced by Alfred Hitchcock, airing on CBS and NBC between 1955 and 1965. It features dramas, thrillers and mysteries. Between 1962 and 1965 it was renamed The Alfred Hitchcock Hour. Hitchcock himself directed only 18 episodes during its run.

By the time the show premiered on October 2, 1955, Hitchcock had been directing films for over three decades. Time magazine named Alfred Hitchcock Presents as one of "The 100 Best TV Shows of All Time". The Writers Guild of America ranked it #79 on their list of the 101 Best-Written TV Series, tying it with Monty Python's Flying Circus, Star Trek: The Next Generation and Upstairs, Downstairs. In 2021, Rolling Stone ranked it 18th on its list of 30 Best Horror TV Shows of All Time.

A series of literary anthologies with the running title Alfred Hitchcock Presents were issued to capitalize on the success of the television series. One volume, devoted to stories that censors would not allow to be adapted for broadcast, was entitled Alfred Hitchcock Presents: Stories They Wouldn't Let Me Do on TV—though eventually several of the stories collected therein were adapted.

History
Alfred Hitchcock Presents is well known for its title sequence. The camera fades in on a simple line-drawing caricature of Hitchcock's rotund profile (which Hitchcock drew), to the theme music of Charles Gounod's "Funeral March of a Marionette" (suggested by Hitchcock's long-time musical collaborator Bernard Herrmann). Hitchcock appears in silhouette from the right edge of the screen, and then walks to center screen to eclipse the caricature. He then almost always says, "Good evening." The caricature drawing and Gounod's "Funeral March of a Marionette" have become indelibly associated with Hitchcock in popular culture.

Hitchcock appears again after the title sequence and drolly introduces the story from an empty studio or from the set of the current episode; his monologues were written by James B. Allardice. At least two versions of the opening were shot for every episode. A version intended for the American audience would often spoof a recent popular commercial or poke fun at the sponsor, leading into the commercial. An alternative version for European audiences would include jokes at the expense of Americans in general. For later seasons, opening remarks were also filmed with Hitchcock speaking in French and German for the show's international presentations.

Hitchcock closed the show in much the same way as it opened, but mainly to tie up loose ends rather than joke. Frequently, a leading character in the story would have seemingly gotten away with a criminal activity; in the postscript, Hitchcock would briefly detail how fate (or the authorities) eventually brought the character to justice.  Hitchcock told TV Guide that his reassurances that the criminal had been apprehended were "a necessary gesture to morality."

Alfred Hitchcock Presents finished at number 6 in the Nielsen ratings for the 1956–57 season, number 12 in 1957–58, number 24 in 1958–59, and number 25 in 1959–60. The series was originally 25 minutes per episode, but it was expanded to 50 minutes in 1962 and retitled The Alfred Hitchcock Hour. Hitchcock directed 17 of the 267 filmed episodes of Alfred Hitchcock Presents — four during the first season and one or two per season thereafter. He directed only the fourth of the 93 50-minute episodes, entitled "I Saw the Whole Thing" with John Forsythe. The last new episode aired on June 26, 1965, but the series has continued to be popular in television syndication for decades.

Guest stars and other actors
Actors appearing in the most episodes include Patricia Hitchcock (Alfred Hitchcock's daughter), Dick York, Robert Horton, James Gleason, John Williams, Robert H. Harris, Russell Collins, Barbara Baxley, Ray Teal, Percy Helton, Phyllis Thaxter, Carmen Mathews, Mildred Dunnock, Alan Napier, Robert Vaughn and Vincent Price.

Many notable film actors, such as Clint Eastwood, Robert Redford, Inger Stevens, Cedric Hardwicke, Robert Newton, Steve McQueen, Bruce Dern, Robert Duvall, Walter Matthau, Robert Loggia, George Segal, Laurence Harvey, Claude Rains, Joan Fontaine, Thelma Ritter, Dennis Morgan, Joseph Cotten, Burt Reynolds, Vera Miles, Tom Ewell, Peter Lorre, Bette Davis, Dean Stockwell, Jessica Tandy, John Gavin, Charles Bronson, Michael Rennie, Phyllis Thaxter, Roger Moore, John Cassavetes, Peter Falk, Teresa Wright, Míriam Colón, Leslie Nielsen, Murray Hamilton, Ricardo Montalbán, Harry Dean Stanton, and Barbara Bel Geddes, among others, also appeared on the series.

Directors
The directors who directed the most episodes included Robert Stevens (44 episodes), Paul Henreid (28 episodes), Herschel Daugherty (24 episodes), Norman Lloyd (19 episodes), Alfred Hitchcock (17 episodes), Arthur Hiller (17 episodes), James Neilson (12 episodes), Justice Addiss (10 episodes), and John Brahm (10 episodes). Other notable directors included Robert Altman, Ida Lupino, Stuart Rosenberg, Robert Stevenson, David Swift and William Friedkin, who directed the last episode of the show.

Broadcast history
The broadcast history was as follows:
 Sunday at 9:30–10 p.m. on CBS: October 2, 1955 – September 1960
 Tuesday at 8:30–9 p.m. on NBC: September 1960 – September 1962
 Thursday at 10–11 p.m. on CBS: September—December 1962
 Friday at 9:30–10:30 p.m.on CBS: January— September 1963
 Friday at 10–11 p.m. on CBS: September 1963 – September 1964
 Monday at 10–11 p.m. on NBC: October 1964 – September 1965

Episodes

Alfred Hitchcock Presents, 25 minutes long, aired weekly at 9:30 on CBS on Sunday nights from 1955 to 1960, and then at 8:30 on NBC on Tuesday nights from 1960 to 1962. It was followed by The Alfred Hitchcock Hour, which lasted for three seasons, September 1962 to June 1965, adding another 93 episodes to the 268 already produced for Alfred Hitchcock Presents.

Two episodes that were directed by Hitchcock were nominated for Emmy Awards. The first episode was "The Case of Mr. Pelham" in 1955 that starred Tom Ewell while the second was "Lamb to the Slaughter" in 1958 that starred Barbara Bel Geddes and Harold J. Stone. In 2009 TV Guides list of "100 Greatest Episodes of All Time" ranked "Lamb to the Slaughter" at #59. The third season opener "The Glass Eye" (1957) won an Emmy Award for director Robert Stevens. An episode of The Alfred Hitchcock Hour titled "An Unlocked Window" (1965) earned an Edgar Award for writer James Bridges in 1966.

Among the most famous episodes remains writer Roald Dahl's "Man from the South" (1960) starring Steve McQueen and Peter Lorre, in which a man bets his finger that he can start his lighter 10 times in a row. This episode was ranked #41 on TV Guides 100 Greatest Episodes of All Time. The episode was later referenced and remade in the film Four Rooms, with Quentin Tarantino directing a segment called "The Man from Hollywood".

The 1962 episode "The Sorcerer's Apprentice" was not aired by NBC because the sponsor felt that the ending was too gruesome. The plot has a magician's helper performing a "sawing a woman in half" trick. Not knowing that the performance is meant to be an illusion, the helper actually cuts an unconscious woman in half. The episode has since been shown in syndication.

Home media
Universal Studios released the first five seasons of Alfred Hitchcock Presents on DVD in Region 1. Season 6 was released on November 12, 2013 via Amazon.com's CreateSpace program. This is a Manufacture-on-Demand (MOD) release on DVD-R, available exclusively through Amazon.com.

In Region 2, Universal Pictures UK has released the first three seasons on DVD, and Fabulous Films has released all seven seasons on DVD, including all three seasons of The Alfred Hitchcock Hour.

In Region 4, Madman Entertainment has released all seven seasons on DVD in Australia. They have also released all three seasons of The Alfred Hitchcock Hour.

1985 revival

In 1985, NBC aired a new TV movie pilot based upon the series, combining four newly filmed stories with colorized footage of Hitchcock from the original series to introduce each segment. The movie was a huge ratings success. The Alfred Hitchcock Presents revival series debuted in the fall of 1985 and retained the same format as the pilot: newly filmed stories (a mixture of original works and updated remakes of original series episodes) with colorized introductions by Hitchcock. The new series lasted only one season before NBC cancelled it, but it was then produced for three more years by the USA Network.

In other media 

In 1962, Golden Records released a record album of six ghost stories for children titled Alfred Hitchcock Presents: Ghost Stories for Young People. The album, which opens with the Charles Gounod Alfred Hitchcock Presents theme music, is hosted by Hitchcock himself, who begins, "How do you do, boys and girls. I'm delighted to find that you believe in ghosts, too. After all, they believe in you, so it is only common courtesy to return the favor."

Hitchcock introduces each of the stories, all the while recounting a droll story of his own failed attempts to deal with a leaky faucet (which at the conclusion of the album leads to Hitchcock "drowning" in his flooded home). The ghost stories themselves, accompanied by minimal sound effects and music, are told by actor John Allen, four of which he wrote himself and two of which are adaptations:

 "The Haunted and the Haunters (The Pirate's Curse)"
 "The Magician ('Til Death Do Us Part)"
 "Johnny Takes a Dare (The More the Merrier)"
 Saki's "The Open Window" (special adaptation)
 "The Helpful Hitchhiker"
 Walter R. Brooks' "Jimmy Takes Vanishing Lessons"

Legacy
American rapper Eminem used the theme song in his song "Alfred's Theme" from his album Music to Be Murdered By – Side B (2020), which itself is one of two albums inspired by Hitchcock's 1958 spoken word record of the same name.

The Netflix anthology series Guillermo del Toro's Cabinet of Curiosities begins each episode with said filmmaker introducing each episode, in the same fashion as Alfred Hitchcock Presents.

References

Further reading
 Grams, Martin, Jr. and Patrik Wikstrom, The Alfred Hitchcock Presents Companion. OTR Pub. 2001
 McCarty, John and Brian Kelleher, Alfred Hitchcock Presents: An Illustrated Guide to the Ten-Year Television Career of the Master of Suspense. St Martin's Press 1985

External links

 
 Alfred Hitchcock Presents at CVTA with episode list
 Universal Studios' Alfred Hitchcock Presents DVD site archived at the Wayback Machine

Alfred Hitchcock
1950s American anthology television series
1960s American anthology television series
1950s American mystery television series
1960s American mystery television series
1950s American horror television series
1960s American horror television series
1955 American television series debuts
1965 American television series endings
American thriller television series
Black-and-white American television shows
CBS original programming
Edgar Award-winning works
English-language television shows
NBC original programming
Television series by Universal Television